Christian Joseph Miele (born February 28, 1981) is an American lawyer and politician. A Republican, he was a member of the Maryland Senate from January 5, 2023, to January 11, 2023, and of the Maryland House of Delegates from January 14, 2015, to January 9, 2019. Miele was appointed to serve as Deputy Secretary of the Maryland Department of Disabilities in the administration of Governor Larry Hogan on January 9, 2019. He resigned this post to become a member of the Maryland Senate on January 5, 2023, representing Maryland's 34th Legislative District.

Family and education
Miele was born in Red Bank, New Jersey. He graduated St. John Vianney High School in Holmdel Township, New Jersey.  He earned Bachelor of Science and Master of Arts degrees from Towson University in 2004 and 2008, respectively. and a JD degree from the Emory University School of Law in 2014.  While at Emory, he joined the Phi Alpha Delta law fraternity, was a co-founder and editor-in-chief of the Emory Corporate Governance and Accountability Review, and served as president of the Federalist Society for Law and Public Policy Studies.  He is married to Dr. Jessica M. Miele.  He is also a member of the Ancient Free and Accepted Masons.

Professional life
Miele worked as an expansion consultant for Sigma Pi Fraternity from 2004 to 2005. He was the Coordinator for Fraternity and Sorority Life at Towson University from 2006 to 2010.  He has also served as a Project Manager for Sequel Design Associates, inc.  During law school, he was as a judicial intern for Judge Glenn T. Harrell, Jr. of the Maryland Court of Appeals, the state's highest court.

State government
Miele is a Republican who represented Legislative District 8 in Baltimore County.  He served on the House Health and Government Operations Committee and the legislature's Joint Committee on Behavioral Health and Opioid Use Disorders.

He ran for the District 8 seat in the Maryland Senate in 2018 but lost to Katherine Klausmeier in the General Election.

Miele was the Republican nominee for Maryland Senate in District 34 for the 2022 Maryland Legislative election. He defeated Butch Tilley with 74% of the vote, and was narrowly defeated by Democratic challenger Mary-Dulany James in the general election. 

Following his defeat, in December 2022, Governor Larry Hogan appointed Miele to the Maryland Senate to replace former state senator Robert Cassilly, who vacated the seat after winning the Harford County executive election. He was sworn in on January 5th, 2023. Miele served in this position for one week until the start of the Maryland General Assembly's 445th legislative session on January 11, 2023. His tenure of just 6 days marks one of the shortest in Maryland Senate history.

Election Results
2014 General Election for Maryland House of Delegates - District 8 
Voters to choose up to three:
{|  class="wikitable"
!Name
!Votes
!Percent
!Outcome
|-
|-
|Christian Miele, Rep
|20,164
|  19.4%
|   Won
|-
|-
|John W. E. Cluster, Jr., Rep.
|19,938
|  19.2%
|   Won
|-
|-
|Eric M. Bromwell, Dem.
|17,361
|  16.7%
|   Won
|-
|-
|Bill Paulshock
|15,899
|  15.3%
|   Lost
|-
|-
|Norma Secoura
|15,660
|  15.1%
|   Lost
|-
|-
|Renee Smith
|14,704
|  14.2%
|   Lost
|-
|Other Write-Ins
|87
|  0.1%
|   Lost
|}

2018 General Election for Maryland Senate - District 8
{|  class="wikitable"
!Name
!Votes
!Percent
!Outcome
|-
|
|-
|Katherine Klausmeier, Dem.
|24,332
|  51.1%
|   Won
|-
|-
|Christian Miele, Rep
|23,271
|  48.8%
|   Lost
|}

 2022 Republican Primary Election for Maryland Senate - District 34

 2022 General Election for Maryland Senate - District 34

References 

1981 births
Living people
Emory University School of Law alumni
American people of Italian descent
Republican Party members of the Maryland House of Delegates
People from Red Bank, New Jersey
St. John Vianney High School (New Jersey) alumni
Towson University alumni